Black River Canal Warehouse is a historic canal warehouse building located at Boonville in Oneida County, New York. It was built in 1850 and is a -story, rectangular, wood-frame building, 28 feet by 40 feet with a gable roof. It was built as a warehouse on the Black River Canal and used as such until the canal was abandoned in 1924.

It was listed on the National Register of Historic Places in 2003.

The building is now home to a hands-on exhibit center for the Boonville Black River Canal Museum.

References

Commercial buildings on the National Register of Historic Places in New York (state)
Commercial buildings completed in 1850
Warehouses on the National Register of Historic Places
Buildings and structures in Oneida County, New York
National Register of Historic Places in Oneida County, New York